Orchid was an American Screamo/hardcore punk band from Amherst, Massachusetts. Active from 1997 until 2002, they released several EPs and splits as well as three studio albums. The band consisted of lead vocalist Jayson Green, drummer Jeffrey Salane, guitarist Will Killingsworth and bassist Geoff Garlock.

In 1999 Orchid released their first record Chaos Is Me and a year after in 2000 released Dance Tonight! Revolution Tomorrow! In July 2002 they released their third studio album Gatefold and later in the year, in September, Orchid released a compilation of both their first and second albums onto CD containing all 21 tracks from both. After the release of both they split up. Posthumously, in 2005 Orchid released Totality, a compilation album comprised all of 24 tracks from out of press and hard to find B-side and split EP material previously only available on vinyl.

History 
The band was formed while Jayson Green, Will Killingsworth, and Brad Wallace were studying at Hampshire College, and Jeff Salane was attending the University of Massachusetts Amherst in early 1998. They played their final show on July 9, 2002.

Jayson Green later formed a hardcore punk supergroup named Violent Bullshit, with members of Black Army Jacket and the Fiery Furnaces. Jayson Green, Will Killingsworth, and Geoff Garlock currently play together in the band Ritual Mess.

Style and legacy 
Orchid's musical style, which has primarily been described as hardcore punk and screamo, is highly dissonant, fast and chaotic. It combines the melodic and poetic approach of post-hardcore and emo with the extremity of powerviolence (a fusion sometimes termed emoviolence) and grindcore. Italian site "Emotional Breakdown" gave a positive review of Orchid's compilation album Totality, saying: "[Orchid] are the concentrated essence of the most poignant music you can imagine: the vocal cords that are pulled until they tear, the music sounds dark and desperate. They possess all these characteristics as the undisputed masters they have taught many proselytes, in all of their cynical splendor."

Orchid is considered a prominent and quintessential band in screamo. Lars Gotrich, when writing for NPR music credited Orchid alongside bands Pg 99, Circle Takes the Square and Majority Rule as being prominent influences on emotional post-hardcore.

Canadian post-hardcore band Silverstein album Short Songs included a covered Orchid's "Destination: Blood".

Members

Final line-up 
 Jayson Green – vocals, keyboards, percussion (1997–2002)
 Will Killingsworth – guitar, keyboards (1997–2002)
 Jeffrey Salane – drums, percussion (1997–2002)
 Geoff Garlock – bass (1999–2002)

Past members 
 Brad Wallace – bass (1997–1999)

Discography

Studio albums 
 Chaos Is Me LP (Ebullition, June 21, 1999)
 Dance Tonight! Revolution Tomorrow! 10" (Ebullition, December 4, 2000)
 Gatefold LP/CD (Ebullition, July 9, 2002)

Compilation albums 
 Dance Tonight! Revolution Tomorrow! + Chaos Is Me CD (Ebullition, September 10, 2002)
 Totality (Clean Plate, CD January 15, 2005, Vinyl 2014)

EPs and split records 
 We Hate You Demo Cassette (Self-Released, 1997)
 Orchid / Pig Destroyer Split 7" (Amendment, 1997)
 Orchid 7" (Hand Held Heart, 1998)
 Orchid / Encyclopedia Of American Traitors Split 7" (Witching Hour Records, 1998)
 Orchid / Combat Wounded Veteran Split 6" (Clean Plate, 2000)
 Orchid / The Red Scare Split 7" (Hand Held Heart, 2000)
 Orchid / Jeromes Dream Skull Record (Witching Hour Records, 2000)

References

External links 
 Ebullition Records
 Clean Plate Records
 

American screamo musical groups
Powerviolence groups
American grindcore musical groups
American post-hardcore musical groups
American emo musical groups
Hardcore punk groups from Massachusetts
Punk rock groups from Massachusetts
People from Amherst, Massachusetts
1997 establishments in Massachusetts
2002 disestablishments in Massachusetts
Musical groups established in 1997
Musical groups disestablished in 2002
Musical quartets
Ebullition Records artists